KJOZ (880 AM) is a radio station, paired with 3 FM relay translators. Licensed to Conroe, Texas, KJOZ primarily serves the northern Houston, Texas metropolitan area. The station broadcasts a Tropical music format.

History

As 900 KMCO
KJOZ started out as a full service country & western station using the call sign KMCO (standing for Montgomery County) in 1951, owned by Reagan Smith & Fred Perry Sr. It was originally located at 900 kHz.

Owen family purchases KMCO; becomes KIKR
In 1974, Steve Owen purchased KMCO, applied to change its callsign to KIKR, and renamed the station "Kicker".  It was co-owned with KNRO at 106.9 FM (currently classic rock KHPT "The Eagle") during this period. The facility was moved to 880 kHz in 1985, after the FM was sold, and upgraded to 10 kilowatts during daytime hours.

Jimmy Swaggart's "Joy of Jesus"
KIKR was sold to Jimmy Swaggart ministries in 1991, resulting in the change to KJOJ calls (standing for "Joy Of Jesus").

Once sold to the Swaggart Ministry, 880 became the simulcast partner of KJOJ-FM's Christian ministry format, which had moved from 106.9 to 103.3 a year earlier, due to 106.9's sale by the Swaggart ministries in 1990. 880's 10 kilowatt signal allowed the ministry to remain over the air in the northern areas of the Houston metro, opposite of the 103.3 signal which is located southwest of the metro.

The last General Manager of KJOJ during its religious format and before its move into Houston was Kathy Watson and last Program Director was Gary Johnson.

Swaggart sells KJOJ, KJOJ-FM
In 1998, KJOJ moved its studio located in The Woodlands to the Clear Channel studios in Houston after being sold by the Swaggart ministry.

In May 2001, KJOJ began to simulcast KTJM 98.5 and its former sister KJOJ-FM as Rhythmic Oldies "Houston's Jammin Hits", along with KQUE 1230 AM.

Liberman acquisition
In July 2001, KJOJ and its FM sister were sold to Liberman Broadcasting, which resulted in both KJOJ and the FM counterpart simulcasting "La Raza" with 1230 & 98.5.

In April 2010, Liberman leased KJOJ's 10 kW signal to Rahan Sidiqqui for Hum Tum City's South Asian programming. After several months IDing as simply "880 KJOJ" with Siddiqui's programming, it returned to simulcasting Houston's 1230 KQUE as Regional Mexican "Radio Ranchito" then as "La Ranchera".

KJOJ becomes KJOZ; Radio Aleluya debuts
It was sold to Daij Media LLC in 2012. During the license reassignment process, Daij Media filed to change calls to KJOZ upon consummation of the sale, in order to disassociate the station from the FM counterpart located in Freeport, Texas. Daij Media then switched KJOZ to Radio Aleluya Spanish Christian preaching and music programming from the Aleluya Broadcasting Network.

880 returns to English language; "Where Diversity Finds Its Voice"
On April 13, 2015, KJOZ dropped Spanish Christian programming and relaunched as an urban talk station with the slogan "Where diversity finds its voice."

By November, KJOZ dropped most of its talk programming to become a de facto replacement for the original KCOH,  featuring many of the former KCOH personalities including Michael Harris & Don Samuel.

Radio Aleluya returns
On April 8, 2016, Urban Talk & Oldies was dropped from 880 KJOZ, returning to the previous Spanish Christian programming of owner Radio Aleluya.

La Calle moves; KJOZ gains an FM translator
In September 2017, the primary for translator 92.5 K223CW was moved from KCOH to KJOZ, moving the Tropical "La Calle" format from KCOH to KJOZ as well.

Rumba 92.5/880
On December 6, 2019, KJOZ rebranded as "Rumba 92.5/880".

Translators

References

External links

JOZ
Conroe, Texas
JOZ
Tropical music